À Nos Amours (To Our Loves) is a 1983 French drama film directed by Maurice Pialat and written by Pialat and Arlette Langmann. Starring Sandrine Bonnaire, Pialat and Evelyne Ker, the story follows a 15-year-old girl, Suzanne (Bonnaire), as she experiences her sexual awakening and becomes promiscuous, but is unable to feel love. À Nos Amours won the César Award for Best Film in 1984.

Plot
Suzanne, a 15-year-old Parisian girl, lives with her volatile, abusive family: her furrier parents and older brother Robert, a writer. She's dating a boy named Luc, who complains about not seeing her as much as he would like. At a cafe, Suzanne mingles with sailors and an American visitor. She and the American head outdoors and have sex, though the experience leaves her miserable. She tells a friend she regrets her unfaithfulness to Luc, but she breaks up with him and becomes increasingly promiscuous. Her father is close to Suzanne but reacts with suspicion and violence when Suzanne goes on a double date with her cousin Solange. When Suzanne returns, her father expresses concern with her changing demeanor, saying she smiles less and seems increasingly bored. He also discloses he has found another woman and is planning to leave the family.

Several days later, Robert tells Suzanne their father has left, and Robert assumes management of the household. Suzanne continues her affairs, though she admits she is unable to feel love. Her mother is desperately unhappy and grows increasingly frustrated with Suzanne's skimpy clothes, her letters from boys, and her attitude at home. Her brother and mother both beat Suzanne during family arguments. Luc returns to Suzanne and asks her to resume their relationship; she refuses. Miserable, Suzanne asks Robert to send her to boarding school, saying she can no longer tolerate home life and has contemplated suicide. She says she is only happy when she is with a man; Robert professes an inability to understand this.

Back in Paris, Suzanne begins a more serious relationship with a young man named Jean-Pierre. While she still says she is unable to feel love, she becomes engaged. Luc reappears and begs her to cancel the wedding. Though she confesses she has considered doing that, she tells him that Jean-Pierre provides her with inner peace for the first time. At a celebratory dinner party, the father unexpectedly shows up, questioning the happiness of the family and revealing Suzanne has been visiting him. He later shows up to see Suzanne leave for her honeymoon, but with another man, leaving Jean-Pierre behind.

Cast

Production
The genesis of the film was Arlette Langmann's screenplay Les filles du faubourg, which Pialat said was written in the 1970s and set in the 1960s, and would have made a three- to four-hour film. After pitching the screenplay to the National Center of Cinematography and Gaumont Film Company around 1975, Pialat began seeking funds to shoot it when his project Les Meurtrières began to flounder.

In Les Filles du faubourg, the characters are Polish Jews, but Pialat minimized the family's heritage to brief references. Due to the small budget, Pialat aborted the period drama element, moving the setting from the 1960s to the present but keeping some of the art design and avoiding mentions of politics or contraception.

Sandrine Bonnaire, who was 15 at the time of filming, has several nude and love scenes in this film. She has said that her personal story at that time is linked to Suzanne's. In fact, during the filming, Bonnaire, who was still a virgin, fell in love with a colleague and had sex for the first time.

Reception
The New York Times journalist Jason Bailey called the film "challenging" with "a freewheeling, languorous vibe". Dave Kehr cited it as "a particularly destabilizing example" of cinematic "immediacy". Time Out listed it 38th in its 100 Best French Films, citing a "moving" depiction of the father-daughter relationship and "The message may be that happiness is as rare as a sunny day, and sorrow is forever". Richard Brody hailed Bonnaire for an "explosive début".

Accolades
The film won the Prix Louis-Delluc for Best Film in 1983 and the César Award for Best Film in 1984. Bonnaire was also awarded the César Award in 1984 for Most Promising Actress for her work in the film. The film was also entered into the 34th Berlin International Film Festival.

References

External links
 
 
À nos amours: The Ties That Wound an essay by Molly Haskell at the Criterion Collection

1983 drama films
1980s teen drama films
1983 films
Films about adultery in France
Best Film César Award winners
Films about adolescence
Films directed by Maurice Pialat
Films set in Paris
French drama films
1980s French-language films
Louis Delluc Prize winners
1980s French films